Artur Waś (born 27 March 1986 in Warsaw) is a Polish speed skater. He competed at the 2014 Winter Olympics in Sochi, in the 500 meters. He is also known to produce Drum and bass under the alias "Voima".

References

External links 
 

1986 births
Polish male speed skaters
Speed skaters at the 2006 Winter Olympics
Speed skaters at the 2014 Winter Olympics
Speed skaters at the 2018 Winter Olympics
Olympic speed skaters of Poland
Speed skaters from Warsaw
Living people